Chester Lee Krause (December 16, 1923 – June 25, 2016) was an American author, numismatist, and businessman best known as the founder of Krause Publications in the 1950s.

Early life
Krause was born in the Town of Helvetia, Wisconsin, in Waupaca County, Wisconsin. He started collecting when he was a boy and his aunts gave him some Whitman coin boards.

Krause served as an auto mechanic in World War II in Belgium, Luxembourg and Germany from 1943 to 1946, serving under George S. Patton. After his discharge, Krause worked on his family's farm and worked on many construction projects.

Career
In 1952, Krause began his publishing career, publishing the first issue of Numismatic News. He also published the Standard Catalog of World Paper Money and Standard Catalog of World Coins, both considered among the hobby's premier resources of the time. In 1955, he expanded the company's numismatic portfolio by creating Coins. Both Coins and Numismatic News are still published today and are among the longest-running numismatic publications in the United States.

Krause's goal was to bring the coin collecting hobby to people in areas generally ignored by other publications and news outlets at the time, which were mainly focused in larger cities. Krause, who was a construction worker by trade, built the publications' offices, which were completed in 1957 and remained the business's home for decades. In 1971, he began publishing a line of publications for car and auto enthusiasts in an effort to diversify and expand his business. He founded the annual Iola Old Car Show in 1972.

Krause served on the American Numismatic Association board of governors from 2007 until 2010.

Krause was a life member of the American Numismatic Association, and was awarded several awards from the ANA, including the Medal of Merit, Glenn Smedley Memorial Award in 1991, Exemplary Service Award, Numismatist of the Year in 1999, Lifetime Achievement Award, the Burnett Anderson Memorial Award in 2009 and the Farran Zerbe Memorial Award, the organization's highest honor, in 1977. In June 2022, the Farran Zerbe Award was renamed the Chester L. Krause Memorial Distinguished Service Award in his honor.

Personal life
Krause was active in many charities and organizations including Rawhide Boy's Ranch, a residential facility for at-risk youth founded by Bart Starr and his wife Cherry, the Badger State Winter Games, the Melvin Laird Center medical research facility at the Marshfield Clinic and the Max McGee National Research Center for Juvenile Diabetes at the Children's Hospital of Milwaukee. He suffered a stroke in 2014, and died after a bad fall in January 2016.

References

1923 births
2016 deaths
People from Waupaca County, Wisconsin
Military personnel from Wisconsin
American numismatists
Businesspeople from Wisconsin
United States Army personnel of World War II
20th-century American businesspeople